The 2012–13 Northern Kentucky Norse men's basketball team represented Northern Kentucky University during the 2012–13 NCAA Division I men's basketball season. The Norse, led by 9th year head coach Dave Bezold, played their home games at The Bank of Kentucky Center and were members of the Atlantic Sun Conference. They finished the season 11–16, 9–9 in A-Sun play to finish in a three-way tie for fourth place. Due to their transition to Division I, the Norse will not be eligible to participate in post season play until 2017.

Roster

Schedule
 
|-
!colspan=9 style=| Non-conference regular season

|-
!colspan=9 style=| Atlantic Sun regular season

References

Northern Kentucky Norse men's basketball seasons
Northern Kentucky
Northern Kentucky Norse men's basketball
Northern Kentucky Norse men's basketball